The Ratcliff Inn is a historic inn and stagecoach stop located at 214 E. Main St. in Carmi, Illinois. The Federal style building was built in 1828 for innkeeper James Ratcliff. Ratcliff was one of Carmi's founders and the city's first postmaster; he also served as White County's first county clerk and probate judge. Abraham Lincoln slept at the inn in 1840 while attending a Carmi political rally in support of William Henry Harrison. The White County Historical Society restored the inn in 1960 to save it from demolition.

The building was added to the National Register of Historic Places on June 4, 1973.

References

External links
 White County Historical Society

Hotel buildings on the National Register of Historic Places in Illinois
Federal architecture in Illinois
Hotel buildings completed in 1828
Buildings and structures in White County, Illinois
Museums in White County, Illinois
National Register of Historic Places in White County, Illinois